Arthur Cazaux (born 23 August 2002) is a French tennis player. He has a career high ATP singles ranking of world No. 229 achieved on 13 February 2023. He also has a career high doubles ranking of world No. 430, achieved of 1 November 2021. Cazaux has won 1 singles Challenger title and 3 singles ITF titles.

Junior career
As a junior, Cazaux reached his highest ranking of number 4 in the world, in the combined singles and doubles junior ranking system. This was highlighted by a runner-up finish at the 2020 Australian Open where he was defeated by compatriot Harold Mayot in straight sets.

Professional career

2020: Grand Slam doubles debut
Cazaux made his ATP main draw debut at the 2020 Open 13 in the doubles draw partnering Harold Mayot when they were granted a wildcard entry. They were defeated in the first round by Nicolas Mahut and Vasek Pospisil in straight sets 5–7, 1–6.

Pairing Mayot again, they were also given a wildcard entry into the main doubles draw of the 2020 French Open but would again be defeated in the first round by Lukasz Kubot and Marcelo Melo in straight sets 2–6, 2–6.

2021: Grand Slam & top 300 debut in singles 
Cazaux made his singles debut the following year in 2021 Geneva Open, winning his first match against compatriot Adrian Mannarino in 3 sets. As a result, he entered the top 500 for the first time in his career.

He made his Grand Slam main draw singles debut at the 2021 French Open as a wildcard where he was defeated by Kamil Majchrzak. At the same tournament, he reached the second round in doubles also as a wildcard partnering with fellow Frenchman Hugo Gaston.

2022-23: First and Second Challenger titles
Cazaux won his maiden Challenger title in September 2022 in Nonthaburi, Thailand, entering the main draw as a qualifier and defeating Omar Jasika in the final.

In January 2023, he won his second title also at the Nonthaburi 2 Challenger defeating former top 50 player Lloyd Harris. As a result he reached a new career-high into the top 300 moving more than 100 positions up to No. 265 on 16 January 2023.

ATP Challenger and ITF Futures finals

Singles: 10 (5–5)

Doubles: 2 (0–2)

Junior Grand Slam finals

Singles: 1 (1 runner-up)

Performance timeline

Singles

Doubles

References

External links

2002 births
Living people
French male tennis players

es:Arthur Cazaux#top